Sultan Kösen (born 10 December 1982) is a Turkish farmer of Kurdish ethnicity who holds the Guinness World Record for tallest living male at .

Kösen's growth resulted from the conditions gigantism and acromegaly, caused by a tumour affecting his pituitary gland. Due to his condition, he uses crutches to walk.

Biography
Kösen, a Turkish man of ethnic Kurdish descent, was born in the village of Alibey in Mardin Province of Turkey. Kösen was unable to complete his education because of his height; he instead worked part-time as a farmer. He describes the advantages of being tall as being able to see a great distance and being able to help his family with domestic tasks such as changing light bulbs and hanging curtains.

Starting in 2010, Kösen received Gamma Knife treatment for his pituitary tumour at the University of Virginia Medical School and was provided with medication to control his excessive levels of growth hormone. It was confirmed in March 2012 that the treatment was effective in halting Kösen's growth.

In October 2013, Kösen married Syrian-born Merve Dibo, who is ten years younger than him. In an interview, he said that his biggest problem with his wife is communication, as he spoke Turkish but his wife spoke only Arabic. The pair divorced in 2021 citing the language barrier as one of the key problems. Kösen hopes to marry another woman someday.

On 13 November 2014, as part of Guinness World Records Day, Kösen met, for the first time, the world's shortest man ever, Chandra Bahadur Dangi (at an event in London.

In 2014, Kösen joined the Magic Circus of Samoa and participated in various shows around the world.

Kösen turned 40 years old on 10 December 2022. He celebrated his birthday a few days early by visiting the Ripley's Believe It or Not! museum in Orlando, Florida, United States, and posing next to a life-sized statue of Robert Wadlow, the tallest man ever, at 272 cm (8 ft 11.1 in).

Records

On 25 August 2010, according to the University of Virginia, a height of up to  had been confirmed by doctors, who stated that this might be Kösen's actual height, artificially lowered by scoliosis and bad posture.

References

External links

 Dünyanın en uzun insanı bir Türk – NTV
 The Tallest Man in the world

1982 births
Living people
People with gigantism
People from Mardin
World record holders
Turkish Kurdish people